Sir Clement Edmund Royds Brocklebank (28 August 1882 – 24 August 1949) was a British Conservative Party politician. He was a Member of Parliament (MP) from 1924 to 1929, and from 1931 to 1945.

At the 1923 general election, he was an unsuccessful candidate in the Smethwick constituency, but at the 1924 election he was elected as MP for Nottingham East, defeating the Liberal Party MP Norman Birkett. At the 1929 election, he did not stand again in Nottingham (where Birkett regained the seat), but stood in Birkenhead East, where the sitting Conservative MP William Stott had stood down. However, he was defeated by the Liberal candidate, former MP Henry White.

Brocklebank returned to the House of Commons at the 1931 general election, when he won the Liverpool Fairfield constituency. He held that seat until his defeat at the 1945 general election.

He was knighted in King George VI's 1937 Coronation Honours.

References

External links 
 

1882 births
1949 deaths
Knights Bachelor
Politicians awarded knighthoods
Conservative Party (UK) MPs for English constituencies
People educated at Summer Fields School
UK MPs 1924–1929
UK MPs 1931–1935
UK MPs 1935–1945